Hote (Ho’tei), also known as Malê, is an Oceanic language in Morobe Province, Papua New Guinea.

Grammar

Stress Patterns 
A. In words up to four syllables, the first syllable is primarily stressed with occasional exceptions.

Example:

 'damak           "lightening"
 'dumloli           "mountain"
 du'viyaŋ          "earthquake"

B. Four-syllable words, rare in the Hote language, have primary stress on the first syllable and secondary stress often on the third syllable. Some compound words have secondary stress on the fourth syllable.

Example:

 'kate'poli              "potato"
 'kubaheŋ'vi          "Friday"

Word Classes 
Hote word classes include nouns, pronouns, verbs, modifiers, relators, location words, time words, demonstratives, and particles. Some words are members of several classes with no structural difference.

Nouns 

 Common Nouns: Most nouns in Hote are common nouns without inflection.
 Example:
 kamuŋ        "jungle"
 ayuk           "firewood"
 pik              "ground"
 uniak          "house"
 Person Names: Hote names are typically nouns and modifiers that have been put together (compound nouns), or sometimes taken from the Jabem or Tok Pisin language.
 Example:
 malak           "home" [male's name]
 kambaŋ        "lime" [male's name]
 Place Names: Place names in Hote are nouns that occur as subject only in an equative clause.
 Example:
 valantik       (name of village)
 biyaŋai        (name of village)
 bayuŋ         "Bulolo"

Compound Nouns 

 Example:
 kubaheŋvi               "Friday" [ku ("garden") baheŋvi ("five")]
 kuayova                  "Thursday" [ku ("garden") ayova ("four)]
 balaliŋ                     "playground" [ba ("ball") laliŋ ("imprint")]

Pronouns 

Pronouns are positioned as regular nouns but not used in descriptive nouns phrases, unless modified by a quantifier. Additionally, they are unable to be possessed.

 Example:

yilu          sapeŋ      ana     tamu         skul

l.dl.exc    all            go       down to    school

"we (exc) all are going to the school."

In the plural forms of both the inclusive and exclusive pronouns, 'aniŋ' is used over 'iniŋ' often by Hote villagers and by coastal dwellers.

 Example:

yanaŋ     sup       "my cloth"

my          cloth

anim       avuŋ      "your dog"

your        dog

aneŋ       kev         "his shirt"

his           shirt

6. Modifiers: Divided into four classes, these words modify nouns, adjectives, and verbs. Class one modifiers are adjectives used to modify nouns and pronouns. These words are found in descriptive noun phrases which indicate size, quality, color, etc. Class two modifiers are adverbs that indicate manner and aspect. Class three modifiers can modify both nouns and verbs, however, there is only one known word. Fourth class modifiers are intensifiers.

Class 1 Example:

daim             "tall, long"

moma           "dry"

ma                "sharp"

lopali             "wet"

thapuk           "white"

doho              "some"

sapeŋ             "all"

tom                 "one"

Class 2 Example:

ketheŋ            "quickly"

daŋ                 "completely"

katu                 "well"

loŋbu               "again"

tibum               "straight"

Class 3 Example:

kambom            "bad, very."

Class 4 Example:

amuŋ                "very"

na                     "very"

Location Words: Hote location words are often depicted by vertical and horizontal planes with the exception of kapo "inside" and yaiŋ "outside." The orientations are as follows:

Vertical:

vuliŋ                 on.top/overhead

vibiŋ                "underneath"

vumak             "underneath" (farther down)

Horizontal:

saka                "over there" (nearest)

toka                 "over there" (near)

toku                 "over there" (far)

tuvulu               "over there" (farthest)

Height:

daka                 up.there (near)

saku                 up.there (far)

daku                 up.there (farthest)

tamu                 down/down to (any distance)

Example:

hamu       vibiŋ         "It is underneath."

3s.is         underneath

Manner Words: These words connect a clause to the following particle of the sentence.

Example:

entek            "this"

aintek            "this"

nena              "that, called"

hatum            "like, as"

ma       yamalu     hanaiŋ     i       aintek   nena

and      3s. talk      to         them   this       that

"and her husband said this,. . ."

Prepositions: In Hote, prepositions connect phrases to clauses.

Example:

aniŋ            "inside"

haviŋ          "with"

imbiŋ          "with"

lok              "with, including"

ek              "for, to, at"

hamu         haviŋ      talebu     lo      lambu

3s.stay       with        mother    and   father

"He stayed with his mother and father."

Time Words: 
Example:

vemam          "later"

vem               "a little while, a little time"

wakbok          "yesterday"

sebok            "before"

yamuŋ           "tomorrow"

denaŋ            "not yet"

Demonstratives: 
Example:

atu               "this"

entek           "this" (close to)

intu              "that" (close to)

namalu          yauna          atu       "This very small boy."

male.child      small.very    this

duviyaŋ         entek                        "It is an earthquake."

Verbs: 
In the Hote language, verbs are divided into four classes depending on what consonant the word begins with and how the word is tensed, class 1, class 2, class 3, and class 4. Class 1 verbs indicate tense signaled by a change in the first consonant of the stem. Class 1 verbs changed to voiced stops before the person marker prefix are prenasalized. Class 2 verb stems are identified by a beginning consonant of either the voiced stop d or b. The initial stop is prenasalized before the person marker to create the potential tense. Class 3 verb stems begin with the voiced prenasalized stop ŋg. Class 4 verb stems encompass all that are marked for poetneial b use of potential tense person markers or tense markers.

More Class 1 Verb Examples:

yaha-va                          "I made/ am making."

ls.make

ya-m-ba                         "I will make."

ls.pot.make

o-n-doyeŋ                      "You will dance."

2s.pot.dance

Class 2 Verb Examples:

yaha-dum                       "I worked/ am working."

1s.work

ya-n-dum                        "I will work."

1s.pot.work

i-n-dum                           "He will work."

3s.pot.work

Class 3 Verb Examples:

yaha-ŋgabom     num          "I am cooking food."

1s.cook               food

ya-ŋgabom         num          "I will cook food."

1s.cook               food

Class 4 Verb Examples:

yahu-mu            "I am resting."

1s.rest

te       ya-mu       "I will rest."

pot     1s.rest

te         i-tuŋ        "He will find."

pot      3s.find

ha-tuŋ                 "He found."

3s.find

Person Markers: 
Actual Tense: verbs in action, completed, or habitual.

Potential Tense: verbs that have not yet taken place but will.

Example:

e-bi                 bok                "They speared the pig."

3p.spear         pig

ni-m-bi            bok                "They will spear the pig."

3p.pot.spear   pig

ho-yuv                                  "You blew/are blowing."

u-yuv                                     "You will blow."

Reduplication: Complete reduplication of numerals signals distribution whereas complete reduplication of quantities signals an increase in quantity. However, reduplication is uncommon in the Hote language.

Example:

tom           "one"

tom tom    "each one"

hawa     numbeŋ   numbeŋ      "He gets very many."

3s.get    plenty      plenty

Counting System: 
The counting system of the Hote language is based on one man which utilizes seven different numerals as a base: 1,2,3,4,5,10, and 20. Numbers in between, (6-9, 11-19, 21+) are indicated by inclusion quantifiers (6-9), multiple quantifier phrases (11-19), and additional quantifier phrases (21+).

Example:

baheŋ vi           "five"

hands half

Example:

baheŋ  vi     lahavu     te                "six"

hands  half  including  one

baheŋ  vi    (ba)    lahavu     ayova     "nine"

hands  half  and   including  four

Example:

laumiŋ ba     lahavu      te             "eleven"

ten       and   including  one

laumiŋ ba   la               baheŋ   vi    ba     lahavu      te            "sixteen"

ten       and including   hands   half and   including   one

Example:

buŋ     te       "twenty"

whole one

buŋ     te   ba    lahavu       lu             "twenty-three"

whole one and including   three

buŋ      te    ba    la              laumiŋ            "thirty"

whole  one  and  including  ten

buŋ      te     ba    la              laumiŋ   ba     lahavu     te                 "thirty-one"

whole  one  and  including   ten         and  including  one

Phonology

Consonants 

Prenasalization: In the Hote language, all voiced prenasalized stops occur in medial position across syllable boundaries in nouns and verbs, except for [ŋg] which occurs word initial. Other exceptions include the following: [mb] can occur in compounds, [g] can occur in the initial position of loan words, and names, and [ŋg] can occur word initial before a low vowel.

[mb] Examples:

Verb

[ ' i . bi . tak ]            / i-bitak/              "they came up"

[ ' im . bi . tak ]        /im-bitak/             "he will come up"

Nouns

[ ' ko . bɔm ]            /kobom/               "custom"

[kam . ' bɔm]           /kam ' bom/          "bad"

[ ' ka . bɛɳ ]             /kabeɳ/                 "famine"

[ ' mam . be^ɳ ]       /mambeiɳ]            "play"

Coumpound

[ ' no^m . ' be^ɳ ]       /noum-beiɳ/        "plenty"

[ ' dʊm . ' be^ɳ ]         /dum-beiɳ/           "a large group"

[nd] Examples: 

Verb

[ ' i . dʊm ]              /i-dum/                 "they work"

Noun

[ ' o^ . do^ɳ ]          /oudouɳ/                "source"

[ ' lɛɳ . ɔɳ . ' dɔɳ ]   /lenondoɳ/             "his ear"

[ng] Examples:

Verb

[ ' ne . gya ]           /ne . gia/              "they will carry"

[ ' ɛɳ . gya ]           /eɳ . gia/              "he will carry"

Noun

[ ' li . giɳ ]             /ligiɳ/                   "sickness"

[ ' maɳ . gin ]       /maɳgin/              "thorn"

References 

South Huon Gulf languages
Languages of Morobe Province